The discography of Balzac, a horror punk band formed in Osaka, Japan in 1992, consists of the numerous releases the band has made through their years in existence. The band has gained some recognition for their non-stop flurry of releases of videos, singles and numerous appearances on tribute albums and compilations.

Balzac was founded by singer and songwriter Hirosuke Nishiyama, remaining the only constant member on the band since its creation. The first demos of the band were self-released under their own label called Evilegend Thirteen. In 1995 they signed to Alchemy Records where they only had one release, their first full length-album, The Last Men On Earth. Afterward, the band signed with Diwphalanx Records, a small but recognized music label in the Japanese indie scene. All later Japanese releases of the band from that point would be on either Diwphalanx or Evilegend Thirteen.

Internationally, the band is signed to The Misfits label, Misfits Records for their releases in the US. They first signed to G-Force Records for Europe and released one album under the label before changing to Gan-Shin Records, an important Germany-based record label specializing in Japanese rock bands.

Studio albums

Compilation albums

Live albums

Singles

References 

Discographies of Japanese artists
Punk rock group discographies